The Lochsa Historical Ranger Station, also known as Lochsa Ranger Station, near Kooskia, Idaho in Idaho County, Idaho, was built during 1927 to 1933.  It served as administrative headquarters for the Lochsa Ranger District from 1922 to 1957.  It was located within the Selway National Forest which was later merged into the Clearwater National Forest and the Nezperce National Forest.  It was listed on the National Register of Historic Places in 1978.

It is located on the Lochsa River.  It was once isolated, accessible only by trail, but by 1976 the Lewis and Clark Highway (U.S. Highway 12) passed by.

The listing included four contributing buildings:
Combination building (1927-1933), built as four separate buildings later joined by a common roof
Ranger dwelling (1932)
Alternate ranger dwelling (1931)
Boulder Creek cabin

The station is open as a museum;  a self-guided walking tour is available.

References

Buildings and structures completed in 1927
Idaho County, Idaho
Museums in Idaho County, Idaho
United States Forest Service ranger stations
Ranger stations in Idaho
Historic districts on the National Register of Historic Places in Idaho